Félix Mejía Fernández-Pacheco (1776, Ciudad Real – 1853) was a Spanish journalist, also remembered as a novelist, playwright and historian.

1776 births
1853 deaths
People from Ciudad Real
Spanish dramatists and playwrights
Spanish male dramatists and playwrights
19th-century Spanish historians
Spanish journalists
Spanish novelists
Spanish male novelists